Retherford is a surname. Notable people with the surname include:

Robert Retherford (1912–1981), American physicist
Wes Retherford (born 1984), American politician
Zain Retherford (born 1995), American wrestler

See also
Rutherford (name)